King Animal Demos is a 10" vinyl EP by the American rock band Soundgarden. It was released on April 20, 2013 through Republic Records. It was released on Record Store Day on a special edition pink vinyl release in the United States, and a standard black edition in Europe.

Overview
The EP is a collection of demos from King Animal. It features six different songs, in their rough mix. The demos were recorded at TNC Studios in Los Angeles and Deke River Studio in Seattle.

Track listing
All tracks written by Chris Cornell, except where noted.
"Bones of Birds" – 3:27
"By Crooked Steps" (Matt Cameron, Ben Shepherd, Kim Thayil) – 4:24
"Halfway There" – 3:34
"Worse Dreams" – 3:21
"Black Saturday" – 3:17
"A Thousand Days Before" (Thayil) – 4:25

Personnel
Soundgarden
Matt Cameron – drums, percussion
Chris Cornell – vocals, rhythm guitar
Ben Shepherd – bass guitar
Kim Thayil – lead guitar

References

Soundgarden EPs
Record Store Day releases
Demo albums
Republic Records EPs
2013 EPs